Khulna–Mongla Port line is a under-construction  broad gauge railway to connect the country with Mongla Port. The Rupsha Rail Bridge is on this proposed line.

Stations
Phultala Junction railway station
 Aranghata railway station
Mohammadnagar railway station
Katakhali railway station
Chulkati railway station
Bhaga railway station
Digraj railway station
Mongla railway station

References

Khulna District
5 ft 6 in gauge railways in Bangladesh
Proposed railway lines in Asia